The military history of Wales refers to military activity that has occurred in Wales or activity of a historic Welsh military or armed forces in Wales.

History

Celts 
The Roman conquest of Wales began in AD 48 and took 30 years to complete; the occupation lasted over 300 years. The most famous of resistance was led by Caradog of the Celtic Catuvellauni tribe (modern day Essex), which were defeated by the Romans. Now leading the Celtic tribes of the Ordovices and Silures (of present day Monmouthshire), Caradog led a successful guerilla war against the Romans. His armies were eventually defeated at the Battle of Caer Caradog on the Anglo-Welsh border in AD 50. Caradog was later taken to Rome and gave a speech, impressing the Roman emperor to the extent that he was pardoned and allowed to live peacefully in Rome.

5th and 6th centuries 
Wales was divided into a number of separate kingdoms, the largest of these being Gwynedd in northwest Wales and Powys in east Wales. Gwynedd was the most powerful of these kingdoms in the 6th century and 7th century, under rulers such as Maelgwn Gwynedd (died 547) and Cadwallon ap Cadfan (died 634/5), who in alliance with Penda of Mercia was able to lead his armies as far as Northumbria in 633.

7th and 8th centuries 
At the Battle of Chester in 616 AD, the forces of Powys and other British kingdoms were defeated by the Northumbrians under Æthelfrith, with king Selyf ap Cynan among the dead. It has been suggested that this battle finally severed the land connection between Wales and the kingdoms of the Hen Ogledd ("Old North"), the Brythonic-speaking regions of what is now southern Scotland and northern England, including Rheged, Strathclyde, Elmet and Gododdin, where Old Welsh was also spoken.

9th and 10th centuries 

The first to rule a considerable part of Wales was Rhodri Mawr (Rhodri The Great), originally king of Gwynedd during the 9th century, who was able to extend his rule to Powys and Ceredigion. Upon his death, his realms were divided between his sons. Rhodri's grandson, Hywel Dda (Hywel the Good), formed the kingdom of Deheubarth by joining smaller kingdoms in the southwest and had extended his rule to most of Wales by 942. He is traditionally associated with the codification of Welsh law at a council which he called at Whitland, the laws from then on usually being called the "Laws of Hywel". Hywel followed a policy of peace with the English. On his death in 949 his sons were able to keep control of Deheubarth but lost Gwynedd to the traditional dynasty of this kingdom.

Wales was also now coming under increasing attack by Viking raiders, particularly Danish raids in the period between 950 and 1000. According to the chronicle Brut y Tywysogion, Godfrey Haroldson carried off two thousand captives from Anglesey in 987, and the king of Gwynedd, Maredudd ab Owain is reported to have redeemed many of his subjects from slavery by paying the Danes a large ransom.

11th and 12th centuries

United Wales 

Gruffydd ap Llywelyn was the only ruler to be able to unite Wales under his rule. In 1055 Gruffydd ap Llywelyn killed his rival Gruffydd ap Rhydderch in battle and recaptured Deheubarth.

Originally king of Gwynedd, by 1057 he was the ruler of Wales and had annexed parts of England around the border. He ruled Wales with no internal battles His territories were again divided into the traditional kingdoms.

Historian John Davies stated that Gruffydd was, "the only Welsh king ever to rule over the entire territory of Wales... Thus, from about 1057 until his death in 1063, the whole of Wales recognised the kingship of Gruffudd ap Llywelyn. For about seven brief years, Wales was one, under one ruler, a feat with neither precedent nor successor." During this time, between 1053 and 1063, Wales lacked any internal strife and was at peace.

Anglo-Norman conflict 

At the time of the Norman conquest of England in 1066, the dominant ruler in Wales was Bleddyn ap Cynfyn, who was king of Gwynedd and Powys. The initial Norman successes were in the south, where William FitzOsbern, 1st Earl of Hereford overran the Kingdom of Gwent before 1070. By 1074 the forces of the Earl of Shrewsbury were ravaging Deheubarth.

The killing of Bleddyn ap Cynfyn in 1075 led to civil war and gave the Normans an opportunity to seize lands in northern Wales. In 1081, Gruffudd ap Cynan, who had just won the throne of Gwynedd from Trahaearn ap Caradog at the Battle of Mynydd Carn, was enticed to a meeting with the Earl of Chester and Earl of Shrewsbury and promptly seized and imprisoned, leading to the seizure of much of Gwynedd by the Normans.

In the south, William the Conqueror advanced into Dyfed founding castles and mints at St Davids and Cardiff. Rhys ap Tewdwr of Deheubarth was killed in 1093 in Brycheiniog, and his kingdom was seized and divided between various Norman lordships. The Norman conquest of Wales appeared virtually complete.

In 1094, however, there was a general Welsh revolt against Norman rule, and gradually territories were won back. Gruffudd ap Cynan was eventually able to build a strong kingdom in Gwynedd. His son, Owain Gwynedd, allied with Gruffydd ap Rhys of Deheubarth, won a crushing victory over the Normans at the Battle of Crug Mawr in 1136 and annexed Ceredigion. Owain followed his father on the throne of Gwynedd the following year and ruled until his death in 1170. He was able to profit from the Anarchy in England to extend the borders of Gwynedd further east than ever before as Stephen of Blois and the Empress Matilda were engaged in a struggle for the English throne.

The Kingdom of Powys also had a strong ruler at this time in Madog ap Maredudd, but when his death in 1160 was quickly followed by the death of his heir, Llywelyn ap Madog, Powys was split into two parts and never subsequently reunited.

In the south, Gruffydd ap Rhys was killed in 1137, but his four sons, who all ruled Deheubarth in turn, were eventually able to win back most of their grandfather's kingdom from the Normans. The youngest of the four, Rhys ap Gruffydd, ruled from 1155 to 1197. In 1171 Rhys met Henry II of England and came to an agreement with him whereby Rhys had to pay a tribute but was confirmed in all his conquests and was later named Justiciar of South Wales. Rhys held a festival of poetry and song at his court at Cardigan over Christmas 1176, which is generally regarded as the first recorded Eisteddfod. Owain Gwynedd's death led to the splitting of Gwynedd between his sons, while Rhys made Deheubarth dominant in Wales for a time.

13th century

Welsh uprising of 1211 

The Welsh uprising of 1211 was a rebellion by several Welsh princes, orchestrated by Llywelyn ap Iorwerth with primary support from Gwenwynwyn of Powys, Maelgwn ap Rhys, Madog ap Gruffydd Maelor and Maredudd ap Robert against King John of England.

The Magna Carta of 1215 was the first document which included English and Welsh law appear together, including reference to common acceptance of the lawful judgement of peers. Chapter 56: The return of lands and liberties to Welshmen if those lands and liberties had been taken by English (and vice versa) without a law abiding judgement of their peers. Chapter 57: The return of Gruffydd ap Llywelyn, illegitimate son of Llywelyn ap Iorwerth (Llywelyn the Great) along with other Welsh hostages which were originally taken for "peace" and "good".

Conquest of Wales by Edward I of England 

In 1274, tension between Llywelyn ap Gruffydd, Prince of Wales and Edward I of England increased when Gruffydd ap Gwenwynwyn of Powys and Llywelyn's younger brother Dafydd ap Gruffydd defected to the English and sought Edward's protection. The continuing conflict with the Marcher Lords, particularly over Roger Mortimer's new castle at Cefnllys, and Edward's harbouring of defectors led Llewelyn to refuse Edward's demand to come to Chester in 1275 to do homage to him, as required by the Treaty of Montgomery. For Edward, a further provocation came from Llywelyn's planned marriage to Eleanor, daughter of Simon de Montfort, the leader of a rebellion against the crown during the reign of Edward's father. In November 1276, Edward declared war on Llywelyn.

Following the uniting of Wales under the rule of the Llywelyn princes, Edward I King of England led 15,00 men to capture Wales following multiple failed attempts by English monarchs to maintain a grip on Wales prior to this. Resistance in Wales was led by the Prince of Wales Llywelyn ap Gruffydd (Llywelyn the Last) and he also made an attempt to recruit more Welsh soldiers in mid-Wales. Llywelyn was killed in the Battle of Orewin Bridge by English soldiers in an ambush trick under the guise of discussions. His head was paraded through London and placed on a Tower of London spike with a mocking crown of laurel leaves.

Llywelyn's brother Dafydd, took over leadership of Welsh fighters, but was caught in 1283. He was dragged through the streets of Shrewsbury by a horse, hanged, revived and disemboweled by English officials. His bowels were thrown into a fire as he watched. Finally, his head was cut off and placed on a Tower of London spike next to his brother Llywelyn, and his body cut into quarters.

Following the deaths of Llywelyn and Dafydd, Edward King of England sought to end Welsh independence and introduced the royal ordinance of the Statute of Rhuddlan in 1284. The statute was a constitutional change causing Wales to lose its de facto independence and formed the Principality of Wales within the "Realm of England". The name refers to Rhuddlan Castle in Denbighshire, where it was first promulgated on 19 March 1284. The statute confirmed the annexation of Wales and introduced English common law to Wales for criminal cases, while civil cases were still dealt with under the Welsh laws of Hywel Dda.

Welsh wars of independence

Madog ap Llywelyn 

Madog ap Llywelyn led a Welsh revolt of 1294–95 against English rule in Wales and was proclaimed "Prince of Wales".  On (29 September) 1294, Madog put himself at the head of a national revolt in response to the actions of new royal administrators in north and west Wales and the imposition of taxes such as that levied on one fifteenth of all movables. As a royal prince descended directly from Owain Gwynedd and distant cousin of the last Prince of Aberffraw (Dafydd ap Gruffudd, the executed brother of Llywelyn), Madog declared himself to be the lawful successor and assumed the royal titles of his predecessors including that of Prince of Wales (an example of which can be seen in the so-called Penmachno Document). The uprising had been planned for months and attacks occurred on the same day across Wales.  While Madog acted in the north the attacks in mid and south Wales were led by Cynan ap Maredudd, Maelgwn ap Rhys, and Morgan ap Maredudd of Gwynllwg in Glamorgan.  The rebel leaders hoped that by the end of September King Edward and most of his forces would be in France on a planned campaign.  However, due to bad weather Edward's army had not yet sailed and he quickly cancelled the French campaign to deal with the Welsh uprising.

In December 1294 King Edward led an army into north Wales to quell the revolt, stopping at Wrexham, Denbigh, Abergele, and elsewhere on his way to Conwy Castle, which he reached shortly before Christmas. His campaign was timely, for several castles remained in serious danger—Harlech Castle was defended at one point by just 37 men.  Edward himself was ambushed and retreated to Conwy Castle, losing his baggage train.  The town of Conwy was burnt down and Edward besieged until he was relieved by his navy in 1295.

The crucial battle between Madog's men and those of the English crown occurred at the battle of Maes Moydog in Powys on 5 March 1295. Surprised by an army led by the Earl of Warwick, the Welsh army regained their composure and successfully defended against an English cavalry charge by using the "porcupine" pike men formation, or schiltron, a formation favoured by the Scots armies against English knights. However, arrows from English archers inflicted heavy losses, and in a pursuit of the Welsh from the battlefield, many Welsh soldiers drowned trying to cross a swollen river. Madog barely escaped from this episode with his life and was a fugitive until his capture by Ynyr Fychan of Nannau and hand over to John de Havering in Snowdonia in late July or early August 1295.

Llywelyn Bren 
Llywelyn Bren was a nobleman who led a 1316 revolt in Wales in the reign of King Edward II of England. Following an order to appear before king Edward the II if England, Llywelyn Bren raised an army of Welsh Glamorgan men which laid siege Caerphilly castle. The rebellion spread throughout the south Wales valleys and other castles were attacked, but this uprising only lasted a few weeks. It marked the last serious challenge to English rule in Wales until the attempts of Owain Lawgoch to invade with French support in the 1370s. Hugh Despenser the Younger's unlawful execution of Llywelyn Bren helped to lead to the eventual overthrow of both Edward II and Hugh.

Owain Lawgoch 

In May 1372 in Paris, Owain Lawgoch announced that he intended to claim the throne of Wales. Lawgoch set sail from Harfleur with money borrowed from Charles V. Owain first attacked the island of Guernsey, and was still there when a message arrived from Charles ordering him to abandon the expedition in order to go to Castile to seek ships to attack La Rochelle.

In 1377 there were reports that Owain was planning another expedition, this time with help from Castile. The alarmed English government sent a spy, the Scot John Lamb, to assassinate Owain, who had been given the task of besieging Mortagne-sur-Gironde in Poitou. Lamb gained Owain's confidence and became his chamberlain, which gave him the opportunity to stab Owain to death in July 1378, something Walker described as 'a sad end to a flamboyant career'. Lawgoch was buried at the Church of St. Leger, near Cognac, France.

With the assassination of Owain Lawgoch the senior line of the House of Aberffraw became extinct and the thought was the entirety of the Aberffraw line had been extinct wrongfully. As a result, the claim to the title 'Prince of Wales' fell to the other royal dynasties, of Deheubarth and Powys. The leading heir in this respect was Owain Glyndŵr, who was descended from both dynasties.

Glyndŵr Rising and Penal Laws 

The immediate and initial cause of Owain Glyndŵr's rebellion is likely the incursion of his land by Baron Grey of Ruthin and the late delivery of a letter requiring armed services of Glyndŵr by King Henry IV of England as well as unfair mediation of this dispute by the English king. Glyndŵr was pronounced Prince of Wales in Glyndyfrdwy on the 16th of September 1400 and with his armies, proceeded to attach English towns in north-east Wales with guerilla tactics, disappearing into the mountains. Allies of Glyndŵr, the Tudor family then captured Conwy Castle at Easter 1401 and in the same year Glyndŵr was victorious against English forces in Pumlumon. he gathered much support across Wales. King Henry led several attempted invasions of Wales but with limited success. Bad weather and the guerilla tactics of Glyndŵr created a mythical status for him, a man at one with the elements who had control over the weather. 

In 1402, the Parliament of England passed a set of laws called the Penal Laws against Wales 1402, which were passed to establish Welsh oppression and English dominance in Wales during the Rising of Owain Glyndŵr against English rule in Wales. Penal laws banned Welsh people from holding a senior public office, bearing arms, buying property in English towns. Penal laws were also applied to English men who married Welsh women. Public assembly was outlawed and the education of Welsh children was limited. These acts were not ended until much later with the Laws in Wales Acts of 1532 and 1542 that were introduced by Henry VIII King of England.

In 1404, Glyndŵr captured Aberystwyth and Harlech castles, formed an agreement with the French and held a Senedd at Machynlleth, crowned Prince of Wales with emissaries from Scotland France and Castille in Spain. French assistance arrived in 1405 and much of Wales was in Glyndŵr's control. In 1406 Glyndŵr wrote the Pennal Letter at Pennal near Machynlleth offering Welsh allegiance to the Avignon Pope rather than the Rome Pope and seeking recognition of St David as archbishop of Wales, clerics fluent in Welsh, two Welsh universities, retention of Welsh Church revenues and that the "usurper" Henry Henry IV should be excommunicated. The French did not respond and the rebellion began to falter. Aberystwyth Castle was lost in 1408 and Harlech Castle in 1409 and Glyndŵr was forced to retreat to the Welsh mountains where he continued occasional guerilla raids. It is likely that he died in 1416 at Kentchurch at the Anglo-Welsh border at the home of his daughter Alys. Glyndŵr remains an icon of Welsh identity and nationalism from the 18th century until today.

Welsh forces as part of the British armed forces

Hundred Years' War
In the Hundred Years' War the Welsh longbowmen were paid mercenaries troops at the Battle_of_Crécy, the Battle_of_Poitiers and the Battle of Agincourt.

Napoleonic wars 
It retained the archaic spelling of Welch, instead of Welsh, and Fuzileers for Fusiliers; these were engraved on swords carried by regimental officers during the Napoleonic Wars.

World Wars 

The world wars and interwar period were hard times for Wales, in terms of the faltering economy of antiwar losses. Men eagerly volunteered for war service.

World War I 
The First World War and its aftermath had severe impact on Wales in terms of economic impact as well as war-time casualties. The result was significant social deprivation. The First World War (1914–1918) saw a total of 272,924 Welshmen under arms, representing 21.5 per cent of the male population. Of these, roughly 35,000 were killed, with particularly heavy losses of Welsh forces at Mametz Wood on the Somme and the Battle of Passchendaele.

The 1st and 2nd battalions of the Royal Welch Fusiliers served on the Western Front from 1914 to 1918 and took part in some of the hardest fighting of the war, including Mametz Wood in 1916 and Passchendaele or Third Ypres in 1917. The Welsh-language poet, Hedd Wyn was part of the Royal Welsh Fusiliers and was killed during the first day of the Battle of Passchendaele during World War I. He was posthumously awarded the bard's chair at the 1917 National Eisteddfod for a poem he wrote on his way to the frontline. Evans, who had been awarded several chairs for his poetry, was inspired to take the bardic name Hedd Wyn ("White Peace" or "Blessed Peace") from the way sunlight penetrated the mist in the Meirionnydd valleys.

Of the South Wales borderers, the 1st Battalion landed at Le Havre as part of the 3rd Brigade in the 1st Division with the British Expeditionary Force in August 1914 for service on the Western Front. The 2nd Battalion landed at Laoshan Bay for operations against the German territory of Tsingtao in September 1914 and saw action at the Siege of Tsingtao in October 1914. After returning home in January 1915, the 2nd Battalion landed at Cape Helles as part of the 87th Brigade in the 29th Division in April 1915; it was evacuated from Gallipoli in January 1916 and then landed at Marseille in March 1916 for service on the Western Front.

Mametz battle 

Mametz Wood was the objective of the 38th (Welsh) Division during the First Battle of the Somme. The attack was made in a northerly direction over a ridge, focusing on the German positions in the wood, between 7 July and 12 July 1916.  On 7 July the men formed the first wave intending to take the wood in a matter of hours. However, strong fortification, machine-guns and shelling killed and injured over 400 soldiers before they reached the wood. Further attacks by the 17th Division on 8 July failed to improve the position.

The Welsh soldiers did not lack in courage, but had been given an impossible task. Eventually Welsh troops fought their way into the woods but were outnumbered by German defenders three-to-one. The Welsh had been trained for this type of warfare. In addition, the wood had poor visibility and was difficult to maintain one's bearings. By dawn of the 12th July, the Welsh had taken Mametz Wood.  The 38th (Welsh) Division was relieved and taken out of the front line.

The commander over British forces at the Somme, Douglas Haig was later described as "The Butcher of the Somme" and 'Butcher' Haig.

World War II 
The war saw Welsh servicemen and women fight in all major theatres, with some 15,000 of them killed. After 1943, 10 per cent of Welsh conscripts aged 18 were sent to work in the coal mines, where there were labour shortages; they became known as Bevin Boys. Pacifist numbers during both World Wars were fairly low, especially in the Second World War, which was seen as a fight against fascism.

The Royal Welch Fusilers regiment was awarded 27 battle honours for World War II, with more than 1,200 fusiliers killed in action or died of wounds. The 1st battalion fought in the short but fierce battles of France and Belgium and was forced to retreat and be evacuated during the Dunkirk evacuation. After two years spent in the United Kingdom, waiting and preparing for the invasion that never came (Operation Sea Lion), the 1st RWF and the rest of 2nd Division were sent to British India to fight the Imperial Japanese Army after a string of defeats inflicted upon the British and Indian troops. The battalion was involved in the Burma Campaign, particularly the Battle of Kohima, nicknamed Stalingrad of the East due to the ferocity of fighting on both sides, that helped to turn the tide of the campaign in the South East Asian theatre.

Of the South Wales Borderers, the 1st Battalion, as part of the 10th Indian Infantry Division, was sent to Iraq to quell a German-inspired uprising in Iraq in November 1941. The battalion saw subsequent service in Iran. The battalion sustained enormous casualties in Libya near Tobruk when they lost around 500 officers and men captured or killed during a general retreat. The battalion found itself cut off when the German forces outflanked them, the Commanding Officer, Lieutenant Colonel Francis Matthews, decided to attempt to escape around the enemy and break through to British lines. It turned into a disaster with only four officers and around one hundred men reaching Sollum.

Upon the outbreak of the Second World War in September 1939, the 2nd Battalion of the South Wales Bordrers was serving in Derry, Northern Ireland, under command of Northern Ireland District, having been there since December 1936. In December 1939 the battalion left Northern Ireland and was sent to join the 148th Infantry Brigade of the 49th (West Riding) Infantry Division, a Territorial formation. In April 1940 the battalion was again transferred to the newly created 24th Guards Brigade (Rupertforce), and took part in the Norwegian Campaign, and were among the first British troops to see action against the German Army in the Second World War. The campaign failed and the brigade had to be evacuated. Casualties in the battalion, however, had been remarkably light, with only 13 wounded and 6 killed and two DCMs had been awarded. The battalion had the distinction of being the only Welsh battalion to take part in the Normandy landings on 6 June 1944, landing at Gold Beach under command of 50th (Northumbrian) Infantry Division and fought in the Battle of Normandy, under command of 7th Armoured Division for a few days in June 1944, before reverting to the 50th Division.

Falklands war 
In 1982, the Welsh Guards (CO Lieutenant-Colonel John Rickett) formed part of the 5th Infantry Brigade of the British Task Force sent to liberate the Falkland Islands from Argentinian occupation during the Falklands War. On 8 June they were on board the ill-fated Sir Galahad, which was accompanied by Sir Tristram, waiting to be landed at Bluff Cove though they were delayed from doing so. However, attack was imminent after the landing craft were spotted by Argentinian observers. At 2:00 am, five Dagger and five A-4 Skyhawk aircraft were seen over the Falklands. Shortly afterwards, the Daggers were the first to attack. Only a short time later, the Skyhawks reached Fitzroy, with three of the aircraft hitting the Sir Galahad two or more times with horrific consequences. Sir Tristram was also hit which killed two crewmen, both ships were ablaze. The attack on Sir Galahad culminated in high casualties, 48 dead, 32 of them Welsh Guards, 11 other Army personnel and five crewmen from Sir Galahad herself. There were many wounded, many suffering from horrendous burns caused by fire from the burning ships, the best known being Simon Weston. The burnt-out Sir Galahad was later scuttled at sea to allow her to become a war grave. On 13-14 June, the remainder of the battalion, reinforced by two companies of Royal Marines from 40 Commando, were given the objective of capturing Sapper Hill in the final stages of the Battle of Mount Tumbledown. Following a firefight at their helicopter landing zone, the force moved on to Sapper Hill but found it abandoned, thus taking the last defensible position before Stanley.

See also 

 Armed forces in Wales

References

Bibliography

External links 

Military units and formations in Wales
Military of Wales